Gresi (Geresi, Glesi, Gresik, Klesi) is a Papuan language of Kemtuk Gresi and South Gresi districts in Jayapura Regency, Indonesia. It is very close to Kemtuik. Gresi is spoken in Bring, Hawa, Ibub, Klaysu, Sunna, Tabangkwari, and Yansu villages (Ethnologue).

References

Nimboran languages
Languages of western New Guinea